POCO, formerly known as POCO by Xiaomi and Pocophone, is a Chinese company specialized in smartphones. The Poco brand was first announced in August 2018 as a mid-range smartphone line under Xiaomi. Poco India became an independent company on 17 January 2020, followed by its global counterpart on 24 November 2020. Poco released its first smartphone, the Pocophone F1 in August 2018.

History
The Poco brand was launched as a Xiaomi sub-brand in August 2018. Xiaomi introduced the Pocophone F1 under the Poco branding which become a success. POCO India become an independent brand before the launch of its second device in January 2020. During the span of 3 years, the company launched 11 devices, most of them are rebranded Redmi smartphones.

In January 2021, POCO India introduced its new logo, mascot, and slogan Made of Mad. POCO Global continues to use the old logo.

Smartphones

POCO F Series

POCO X Series

POCO M Series

POCO C Series

Smartwatch

Update Policy
The Android and MIUI upgrades support may vary depending on the series model.

References

External links 
 

Xiaomi
Chinese brands
Electronics companies of China
Mobile phone companies of China
Mobile phone manufacturers